The New Great Migration is the demographic change from 1970 to the present, which is a reversal of the previous 60-year trend of black migration within the United States. 

Since 1970, deindustrialization of cities in the Northeastern and Midwestern United States, growth of jobs in the "New South" with lower costs of living, family, desire to reunite with specific Black cultures (such as the Gullah people), kinship ties, the perception of lessening discrimination and religious connections have all acted to attract African Americans to the Southern United States in substantial numbers. Between 1965 and 1970 the Southern states lost around 287,000 African Americans, while from 1975 to 1980 the South United States had a net gain of 109,000 African Americans, showing the reversal of the original Great Migration. Between 1975 and 1980, several Southern states saw net African American migration gains. In 2014, African American millennials moved in the highest numbers to Texas, Georgia, Florida, and North Carolina.  African American populations have continued to drop throughout much of the Northeast, especially from the state of New York and northern New Jersey, as they rise in the South. In Massachusetts, even though the black population saw a net increase between 2010 and 2020, the Greater Boston area lost approximately 8,800 black residents and Massachusetts lost an average of 11,700 black residents per year from 2015 to 2020, with approximately half moving to Southern states and Georgia and Florida being the most popular destinations.

Demographic shifts
College graduates and middle-class migrants make up a major portion of the new migration. For instance, from 1965–2000, the states of Florida, Georgia, and Texas attracted the most black college graduates. The only state outside the former Confederate States that attracted a sizeable migration of black college graduates was Maryland, most of the population growth being in the counties surrounding Washington, D.C. In that same period, California was a net loser of black migration for the first time in three decades. While the migration is still in progress, much data is from this 35-year period.

The New Great Migration is not evenly distributed throughout the South. As with the earlier Great Migration, the New Great Migration is primarily directed toward cities and large urban areas, such as Atlanta, Charlotte, Houston, Dallas, Raleigh, Washington, D.C., Tampa, Virginia Beach,  San Antonio, Memphis, Orlando, Nashville, Jacksonville, and so forth. North Carolina's Charlotte metro area in particular, is a hot spot for African American migrants in the US. Between 1975 and 1980, Charlotte saw a net gain of 2,725 African Americans in the area. This number continued to rise as between 1985 and 1990 as the area had a net gain of 7,497 African Americans, and from 1995 to 2000 the net gain was 23,313 African Americans. This rise in net gain points to Atlanta, Charlotte, Dallas, and Houston being a growing hot spots for the migrants of The New Great Migration. The percentage of Black Americans who live in the South has been increasing since 1990, and the biggest gains have been in the region’s large urban areas, according to census data. The Black population of metro Atlanta more than doubled between 1990 and 2020, surpassing 2 million in the most recent census. The Black population also more than doubled in metro Charlotte while Greater Houston and Dallas-Fort Worth both saw their Black populations surpass 1 million for the first time. Several smaller metro areas also saw sizable gains, including San Antonio; Raleigh and Greensboro, N.C.; and Orlando. Primary destinations are states that have the most job opportunities, especially Georgia, North Carolina, Maryland, Virginia, Tennessee, Florida and Texas. Other southern states, including Mississippi, Louisiana, South Carolina, Alabama and Arkansas, have seen little net growth in the African American population from return migration.

Religion has been suggested to be one of the causes of the New Great Migration. Many migrants of the New Great Migration try to find a "sign of God" about moving, and even those coming for job reasons will use faith to manage the feelings of uncertainty that come with moving to another state. Some migrants move to get more connected to their faith and see the move as a "spiritual journey", as the Southern states (often called the Bible Belt) have a large number of churches and a heavy connection to Protestant Christianity.

See also

By city
African Americans in Atlanta
History of African Americans in Baltimore
History of African Americans in Dallas-Fort Worth
History of African Americans in Houston
History of African Americans in Jacksonville, Florida
History of African Americans in San Antonio

By state
African Americans in Alabama
African Americans in Florida
African Americans in Georgia (U.S. state)
African Americans in Louisiana
African Americans in Maryland
African Americans in Mississippi
African Americans in North Carolina
African Americans in South Carolina
African Americans in Tennessee
History of African Americans in Texas
History of African Americans in Virginia

References

History of the Southern United States
African-American demographics
Midwestern United States
Northeastern United States
Western United States
Internal migrations in the United States
Post–civil rights era in African-American history